Friends is a 1993 South African drama film directed by Elaine Proctor. It was entered into the 1993 Cannes Film Festival, where it won an award for Caméra d'Or Special Distinction. The film is set during apartheid in Johannesburg and follows three friends who each represent a different faction of South African society.

Plot 
Three young women live together in apartheid-era Johannesburg, with each of them dealing with apartheid in different ways. Thoko, a Black woman, works as a schoolteacher and practices non-violent passive resistance. Aninka, an Afrikaner, is an archeologist who rejects her family’s pro-apartheid politics. Sophie, who is from a white British family, is a librarian but secretly belongs to an anti-apartheid terrorist organization. Sophie plants bombs in public places on behalf of the organization. One day, a bomb she leaves at an airport explodes and kills innocent bystanders, including an elderly Black woman. The tragic incident fractures the women’s friendships and loyalties.

Cast
 Kerry Fox as Sophie
 Dambisa Kente as Thoko
 Michele Burgers as Aninka
 Marius Weyers as Johan
 Tertius Meintjes as Jeremy
 Dolly Rathebe as Innocentia
 Wilma Stockenström as Iris
 Carel Trichardt as Rheinhart
 Anne Curteis as Sophie's mother
 Ralph Draper as Sophie's father
 Mary Twala as Grace
 Maphiki Mabohi as Daphne
 Job Kubatsi as Maurondile
 Vanessa Cooke as Prison's warden
 Jerry Mofokeng as Thomi
 Trevi Jean Le Pere as Jeremy's lover

Reception 
David Stratton of Variety wrote "The tense, divided realities of life in contemporary South Africa are vividly brought to the screen in 'Friends,' a provocative pic from first-time writer-director Elaine Proctor. Despite intriguing characters and good performances, however, the film is saddled with a schematic screenplay that leaves many questions unanswered and problems unaddressed." Stratton contended though the screenplay has "many rough edges and contrivances", Friends "is so well-acted that the occasional flaws can be easily overlooked." He concluded "Proctor’s depiction of the uneasy atmosphere of Johannesburg between 1985 and 1990 is so vivid that audiences should be completely caught up in the drama."

Writing for the San Francisco Chronicle, Leah Garchik said, "'Friends' is a movie about politics, but without political diatribe; about relationships, but without a single touchy-feely frame; about women, but without a feminist agenda; and about South Africa without bias from right or left." Barbara Shulgasser, writing for the San Francisco Examiner, was more critical, stating, "Fox and Kente give stirring performances and Procter's depiction of South Africa's institutionalized prejudice is chilling. But the film never arrives at the emotional punch it seems to be moving toward and that is a disappointment."

Friends was shown in competition at the 1993 Cannes Film Festival, where it won a Prix de Camera D’Or - Special Mention honor.

References

External links

Friends at AllMovie
Friends at Protagonist Pictures
Friends at TCM Movie Database

1993 films
1990s English-language films
1993 drama films
1993 independent films
Films set in South Africa
Films shot in South Africa
English-language South African films
1990s political drama films
Films about race and ethnicity
Films directed by Elaine Proctor
Films scored by Rachel Portman
South African drama films
Apartheid films
Films set in 1985
1990s female buddy films